Jonathan Cooper  (born 22 June 1961) is Professor of Engineering in the College of Science & Engineering at the University of Glasgow. Professor Cooper has held the Wolfson Chair in Bioengineering at the school since 2009.

Research and career 

After graduating from a PhD at the University of Oxford, Cooper was employed as a lecturer at the University of Glasgow in 1991. He was awarded the title of Professor in 1998, becoming the youngest person to have been awarded the position at the university at the time. He was elected as a Fellow of the Royal Society of Edinburgh in 2001 and a Fellow of the Royal Academy of Engineering in 2004. In 2008 he was made the Wolfson Professor of Bioengineering, a position which he currently holds.

Cooper lectures undergraduate and masters programs on electronics and biomedical engineering at the University of Glasgow. In 2012 he established University of Glasgow’s degree programme in Biomedical Engineering, which was the first of its kind in Scotland. He has supervised over 40 PhD students since 1996, and was the leader of the EPSRC-funded Doctoral Training Centre in Bioengineering from 2006 to 2017.

As of June 2021 Cooper’s research has been published over 265 times in peer-reviewed journals such as Nature, PNAS, Lab on a Chip and Chemical Communications. He has developed techniques in a range of disciplines including Lab-on-a-Chip diagnostics, cell measurements and proteomics. His work has been recognised by many invited/plenary lectures at international conferences, including Microfluidics and Nano-fluidics, the European Congress of Lab-on-a-Chip, micro-Flu, European Congress of Lab-on-a-Chip and Asia Pacific Congress on Lab-on-a-Chip.

Field research 

Cooper’s research in microfluidics includes the development of low-cost “origami” lateral flow diagnostics, which use folded paper to control the mixing of diagnostic reagents. This technique has been trialled for field use in several low-resource locations including Vietnam, for the early detection of sepsis, and in Uganda for the detection of tropical diseases such as malaria and schistosomiasis.

Awards and honours 

 Elected Fellow of the Scotland’s National Academy of Science & Arts, Royal Society of Edinburgh (2001)
 Elected Fellow of the UK’s National Physics Academy, Institute of Physics (2003)
 Elected Fellow of the UK’s National Electronics Academy, Institute of Electrical Engineering (2003)
 Elected Fellow of the UK’s National Engineering Academy, Royal Academy of Engineering (2004)
 Royal Society Merit Award (2010)

Selected publications

References 

1961 births
Living people